Mirificarma minimella is a moth of the family Gelechiidae. It was described by Peter Huemer and Ole Karsholt in 2001. It is found in Greece.

References

Moths described in 2001
Mirificarma
Moths of Europe